The following is the discography of Sunrise Avenue, a Finnish rock band originally formed in 1992 as "Sunrise". The band changed its name to "Sunrise Avenue" in 2001.

Albums

Studio albums

Live albums

Compilation albums

EPs

Singles

Promotional singles
 "Forever Yours" (2007, Finland)
 "Birds and Bees" (2009) (Samu Haber, Aku Sinivalo, Jukka Backlund)

Videos

Music videos

Video albums
 Live in Wonderland (2007)
 Out of Style - Live Edition (2012)

Collaborations
 All of Us feat. Samu Haber - "The White Rider"

Special performances and theme songs
 "Fairytale Gone Bad" – Tour de France theme song ZDF 2006
 "Choose to Be Me" – Big Brother Germany theme song 2008
 "Fairytale Gone Bad" – Nikolai Valuev vs Jameel McCline WC Heavyweight boxing, Basel Switzerland 2008
 "The Whole Story" – WC athletic games Berlin opening song 2009
 "Not Again" – David Haye vs Nikolai Valuev WC Heavyweight boxing 2009, Nurnberg Germany
 Concert at Munich Olympic Stadium before UEFA Football European League Final game (Munich - Chelsea) in 2012
 "Iron Sky" – theme song from the 2019 film Iron Sky: The Coming Race

List of songs by Sunrise Avenue

 6-0 - Popgasm (2009)
 All Because of You - On the Way to Wonderland (2006)
 Angels on a Rampage - Out of Style (2011)
 Bad - Popgasm (2009)
 Birds and Bees - Popgasm (2009)
 Bye Bye (One Night Kind) - Popgasm (2009)
 Choose to Be Me - On the Way to Wonderland (2006)
 Damn Silence - Out of Style (2011)
 Destiny - On the Way to Wonderland (2006)
 Diamonds - On the Way to Wonderland (2006)
 Dream Like a Child - Popgasm (2009)
 Fail Again - B-track, "Choose to Be Me" single (2008)
 Fairytale Gone Bad - On the Way to Wonderland (2006)
 Fight Til Dying - On the Way to Wonderland (2006)
 Forever Yours - On the Way to Wonderland (2006)
 Happiness - Happiness EP (2009)
 Heal Me - On the Way to Wonderland (2006)
 Hollywood Hills - Out of Style (2011)
 I Don't Dance - Out of Style (2011)
 I Gotta Go - Out of Style (2011)
 Into the Blue - On the Way to Wonderland (2006)
 It Ain't the Way - On the Way to Wonderland (2006)
 Keep Dreaming
 Kiss Goodbye - Out of Style (2011)
 Kiss n Run - Popgasm (2009)
 Lakatut Varpaankynnet - Dingo cover
 Make It Go Away - On the Way to Wonderland (2006)
 Monk Bay - Popgasm (2009)
 My Girl Is Mine - Popgasm (2009)
 Nasty - On the Way to Wonderland (2006)
 Not Again - Popgasm (2009)
 Only - On the Way to Wonderland (2006)
 Out of Tune - Out of Style (2011)
 Rising Sun - Popgasm (2009)
 Romeo - On the Way to Wonderland (2006)
 Runaway
 Sail Away with Me - Popgasm (2009)
 Sex and Cigarettes - Out of Style (2011)
 Somebody Help Me - Out of Style (2011)
 Somebody Will Find You Someday
 Something Sweet - Popgasm (2009)
 Stormy End - Out of Style (2011)
 Sunny Day - On the Way to Wonderland (2006)
 Sweet Symphony - Out of Style (2011)
 The First Cut Is the Deepest - Cat Stevens cover
 The Right One - Out of Style (2011)
 The Whole S]tory - Popgasm (2009)
 Welcome to My Life - Popgasm (2009)
 What I Like About You
 Wonderland - On the Way to Wonderland (2006)

References

Rock music group discographies
Discographies of Finnish artists